Gopalganj district of Bihar, India is divided into 2 sub-divisions, 14 Blocks and has a total of 1566 villages. There are 169 uninhabited villages (out of 1,566 total villages) in the district of Gopalganj. Kuchaikote Block has the highest number of villages (222) in the district and Sidhwalia Block has the lowest number of villages (50). Dighwa of Baikuntpur C.D. Block is the most populated village (21,100) and Rini Math of Bhorey C.D. Block is the least populated villages (1) in the district as per 2011 Census. Rampur Tengrahi of Gopalganj Block has the largest area (2,428 hectare) and Man urf Basant Chhapra of Baikunthpur Block has the smallest area (2 hectare) among the villages in the district.

This is list of villages of Gopalganj district according to respective blocks.

Baikunthpur 

 Ahiapur
 Ahiyapur
 Ajbi Nagar
 Alapur
 Bahrampur
 Baikunthpur
 Bakhri
 Balha
 Bamon
 Bangra
 Banhauli Banaura
 Bankat
 Bankati
 Bansghat Masuaria
 Bardhauli
 Basaha
 Basant Chhapra
 Bhagwanpur
 Bhilarpur
 Bhimpurwa
 Bibipur
 Bilarpur
 Bilarpur
 Bistaul
 Chak Paharpur
 Chamanpura
 Chandpur
 Chhapia
 Chiuntaha
 Dekuli
 Dhab
 Dhab Nizamat
 Dharambari
 Dhursanda
 Dighwa
 Dila Tola
 Dipau
 Fajullahpur
 Fatehpur
 Gamhari
 Gandhua
 Ghoghraha
 Ghoghraha
 Gorauli
 Gorauli Khap
 Hakram
 Hamidpur
 Hardia
 Hathiahi
 Hemu Chhapra
 Jadopur
 Jagdishpur
 Jagdispur
 Kalyanpur
 Karanpura
 Kashi Tengrahi Khap
 Katalpura
 Khaira Asha
 Khaira Asha Diara
 Khaira Azam
 Khap Pakri
 Khirodharpatti
 Khobharipur
 Khorampur Birt
 Khurampur
 Kiratpur
 Mahammadpur Diara
 Mahammadpur Nizamat
 Maharani Pandohi
 Maharani Ugarsain
 Mahua
 Mahua Khap
 Majhaulia
 Man Tengarhi Khap Serha
 Man Tengrahi
 Man Tengrahi
 Man Tengrahi Basant Chhapra
 Man Tengrahi Khap Sokni
 Man urf Basant Chhapra
 Mangalpur
 Mangalpur Birt
 Mangru Chhapra
 Marwa
 Matiari
 Munja
 Munja Usri
 Narwar
 Paharpur Kamsila
 Pakaha
 Pakri
 Pararia Malikan
 Pararia Nizamat
 Parsauni
 Parsauni
 Pearepur
 Phakalpura
 Pipra
 Raja Patti
 Ramgarh
 Rana Khap
 Rewtith
 Rohua Tal
 Rupra
 Sanaut
 Satpatia
 Satpatia Kal Kalahi
 Sattah
 Shafiabad
 Shampur
 Shankarpur
 Sirsa
 Sisai
 Siswan
 Sitalpur
 Sonbarsa
 Sonwalia
 Teinrua
 Usri
 Usri
 Usri Mahal Munja
 Usri Paharpur

Barauli 

 Alapur
 Babhnauli
 Bagheji
 Baghwar Nizamat
 Bakhraur Jaddi
 Bakhraur Pachpatia
 Balha
 Balra
 Bankat
 Barhea
 Batardeh
 Belsand
 Belsand
 Bhagar Jalkar
 Bhagwatipur
 Bhikhampur
 Bishesarpur
 Bishunpura
 Chak Manjhan
 Chandauli
 Dangsi
 Dewapur
 Dharwa
 Diara Baghwar
 Diara Batardeh
 Diara Rupan Chhap
 Diara Tarwa
 Haluar
 Hasanpur
 Jalpurwa
 Jokaha
 Kahla
 Kalyanpur
 Kalyanpur Madhubani
 Kalyanpur Mathia
 Kamalpur
 Khajuria
 Kutlupur
 Larauli
 Madhopur
 Mahammadpur Jaddi
 Mahammadpur Jaddi
 Mahammadpur Marwat
 Mahammadpur Matiara
 Mahammadpur Nilami
 Manjharia
 Maranpur
 Mathurapur
 Milki Biraicha
 Mirzapur
 Moghal Biraicha
 Mohiuddinpur Pakaria
 Nadhna
 Nawada
 Neori
 Pachrukhiya
 Panditpur
 Parsa
 Parsauni
 Pet Biraicha
 Pipra
 Pipra
 Piprahia
 Rampur
 Rampur
 Rupan Chhap
 Sadaua
 Salempur
 Salona
 Saraiya Pahari
 Sarar
 Sarean Narind
 Sarfara
 Semaria
 Siarua
 Sikatia Babu Raj Kumar Sahi
 Sikatia Sirdhar Sahi
 Sikatia Sirdhar Sahi
 Sonbarsa
 Tola Kinnu Ram

Bhorey 

 Ajab Chhapra
 Amahi Misir
 Amahi Shukul
 Amwa
 Arazi Husepur
 Arazi Korea
 Arazi Motipur
 Babhanike Bhum
 Babhanike Bhum urf Multan
 Bagahwa Jagirdari
 Bagahwa Misir
 Bagahwa Tiwari
 Bairona
 Bakharia
 Balwa
 Bandhwa
 Bania Chhapar
 Bankata Jagirdari
 Bankata Khas
 Bankatamal
 Banlaria Ghur
 Bantaria Jagdish
 Bantaria Sansar
 Bara Chhap
 Barahara
 Barai Bagahwa
 Barai Bagahwa
 Barehi
 Barhea
 Basdewa
 Belwa Misir
 Belwa Thakurai
 Bhadohi
 Bhanpur
 Bhanua
 Bhikha Chhapar
 Bhiswa Arazi Mafi
 Bhiswa Khalsa
 Bhopatpura
 Bhore
 Bisrampur
 Bisrampur
 Bithua
 Chafwa
 Chak Dharamnath
 Chakarwa
 Chakarwa Khas
 Chakia
 Chakmukha
 Chhathianw
 Chhitni Pokhar
 Deal Chhapar
 Dharahra
 Dharampur
 Dighwa
 Dihchakarwa
 Domanpur
 Dubaulia
 Dumakiya
 Dumar Narind
 Dumar Shukul
 Dumar Tilak
 Dumaria
 Durbasa
 Garuraha
 Ghorath
 Ghortha
 Gopalpur
 Gopi Chhapra
 Hardia
 Hardiya
 Hariharpur
 Hariharpur
 Husepur
 Imilia
 Jagirdari Bagahwa
 Jagtauli
 Jaitpur
 Jaitpura
 Jhil
 Jigna Dube
 Jigna Pandit
 Jigna Panre
 Jiut Chhapra
 Jotsi Tola
 Juit Chhapra
 Kabe
 Kalyanpur
 Kalyanpur Khurd
 Karmaha
 Karmasi
 Khadhi
 Khajurha Misir
 Khajurha Panre
 Khajuria
 Khalganw
 Khapkat Parrauna
 Kharag Ram Chhapra
 Kharpakwa
 Kheduwapur
 Kishunpura
 Koera
 Koergawan
 Koreya
 Kuaridih
 Kurthia
 Kusaha
 Lachchhi Chak
 Lachhmipur
 Lachhmipur
 Lakataha
 Lala Chhapar
 Lami Chaur
 Luhsi
 Mahra Deur
 Malahni
 Malchaur
 Mathauli
 Mathia
 Mathiya
 Misrauli
 Misrauli
 Misrauliya
 Motipur Nizamat
 Muradih
 Nadwa
 Naru Chakarwa
 Naya Ganw
 Nonia Chhapar
 Nonia Chhapar Doem
 Noniyan Chhapra
 Pakhopali
 Panre Tola
 Pariwadh
 Parrauna
 Parsauni
 Parshahi
 Phattu Chhapar
 Phulwaria
 Piarauta
 Pipar Chafa
 Raghunathpur
 Ram Nagar
 Rampur
 Rampur Pariwadh
 Raqba
 Rawa Raksa
 Renrwariya shukul
 Renrwariya Tewari
 Rini Math
 Rudarpur
 Sabea
 Saktauli
 Saunsarpur
 Sawanha
 Semra
 Semrauna
 Shahpur
 Shiwrajpur
 Sidhwa
 Sirsia
 Sisai
 Siswa
 Siswa
 Sumeri Chhapar
 Tamkuhi
 Tanrwa
 Tiwari Bagahwa
 Tiwari Chhapar
 Tola Bala Shukul
 Zorawar Chhapra
 Zorawarpur

Gopalganj 

 Amwa Moazzam
 Amwa nakchhed
 Arazi Bikrampur
 Bairag Khap
 Banjari
 Baraipatti
 Basdila Khap
 Basdila Khas
 Bhasahi
 Bhit Bherwa
 Bhojli Hissa
 Bhojli Hissa
 Bikrampur
 Bishunpura
 Bochahi
 Chainpatti
 Chatur Bagaha
 Chauranw
 Domahata
 Dumaria
 Ekderwa
 Gamharia
 Garaiyakhal
 Hariharpur
 Harpur
 Harpur
 Hathipatti
 Hirapakar
 Jadopur Dukhharan
 Jadopur Shukul
 Jagiri Tola
 Kankar Kund
 Kararia
 Katgharwa
 Khairatiya
 Khap Jagmalwa
 Khap Maksudpur
 Khargauli
 Khawajepur
 Konhwa
 Kotwa
 Kukur Bhukka
 Machhaha
 Mainpur
 Maksudpur
 Makundia
 Mali Kana
 Manjhariya
 Manpura
 Masan Thana
 Mathia
 Mathia
 Mehdiya
 Nawada
 Nawada Chutur Bagaha
 Nawadah
 Niranjana
 Pasarma
 Rajokhar
 Rajwahi
 Rajwahi Hissa
 Rampur Tengrahi
 Sadullahpur
 Saha Digari
 Semra
 Semrahi
 Takia Bankat
 Takia Yakub
 Tirbirwa
 Tok Bairia
 Turkaha
 Walipur

Hathua 

 Alawal Patti
 Atwa Durg
 Atwa Karan urf Mahadewa
 Babhneti
 Bagahi Bairisal
 Bangra
 Barai Patti
 Barhea
 Bari Dhanesh
 Bari Ishar
 Bari Raybhan
 Barka Amtha
 Barka Ganw
 Barwa Kaparpura
 Basatpur
 Basatpur
 Bhagirathi
 Bhairo Patti
 Bharathpura
 Bhatwalia
 Bhoj Hata
 Bigahi Jagdish
 Bishunpura
 Chainpur
 Chak Chand
 Chand Patti
 Chhap
 Chochahi Chhachhai
 Darzi Patti
 Deuria
 Dharni Hata
 Ekdanga
 Ekdanga
 Fatehpur
 Ghinhu Chhapra urf Parhadwa
 Ghosia
 Gopalpur
 Harpur
 Hata Korara
 Hathua Buzurg
 Jainan
 Jigna Gopal
 Jigna Jagarnath
 Kabliswa
 Kalu Patti
 Kandhgopi
 Khairatia
 Kharauni
 Kharji Chhap
 Kheman Tola
 Khoriya Patti
 Khushihal Chhapar
 Kusaundhi
 Lain Bazar
 Machhagar Patti Jagdish
 Machhagar urf Lachhiram Patti
 Manikpur
 Manni Chhapar
 Mathia
 Matihani Madho
 Matihani Nain
 Mirzapur
 Misrauli
 Mohaicha
 Mohammadpur Kharji
 Mohanpura
 Munrera
 Mura
 Narainian
 Naya Ganw
 Otni Patti
 Pachphera
 Pakri
 Panre Samail
 Parman Patti
 Pipar Panti
 Pipar Panti
 Pipra Jado
 Pipra Khas
 Piuli
 Rajapur
 Rani Sariswa
 Ratan Chak
 Repura
 Rupan Chak
 Rasulpur
 Sabea
 Saheba Chak
 Samail Gaurup
 Samail Pareag Singh
 Samail Qasim
 Samail Tiwari
 Sariswa Gosain
 Sariswa urf Lohar Toli
 Satain
 Satain Khap
 Sauren
 Semranw
 Sihorwa
 Singaha
 Siriswa Dube
 Sohagpur
 Supahi
 Surwania
 Tarau Chak
 Tarau Chak Ke Khap
 Turuk Patti
 Zimda Patti

Kateya 

 Amahi  Banke
 Amea
 Amwa
 Arazi Khap Pachamwa Dube
 Arazi Rudarpur
 Aunrahi
 Babhni
 Bagahi Dih
 Bagahi Khas
 Baikunth Pur
 Bairia
 Bandarha Baikunthpur
 Bania  Chhapar
 Barehi
 Bari Sujawal
 Barwa
 Belahi Dih
 Belaura
 Belwa Dube
 Belwa Tiwari
 Bhagi Patti Jhil
 Bhagi Patti Khurd
 Bhainsahi
 Bhaluhi Asaram
 Bharthahi
 Bheria
 Bhopatpur
 Bhopatpur
 Bhopatpur Parsahi
 Bilahi Khas
 Binod Chak
 Bishunpura
 Bishunpura
 Burhia Bari
 Chakia
 Chaphwa
 Dharhara
 Dharhara
 Dharmagta
 Dhodhila
 Dube Pachamwa
 Duhauna
 Dumaria
 Dumrauna
 Gaura
 Ijra
 Indarwa
 Jaguhi
 Jaipur
 Jasauli
 Jhilwania
 Kalyanpur
 Kamdhenwa
 Kanchanpur
 KarKataha
 Karmaini
 Khadahi
 Kishunpura
 Kolhuar Bagahi
 Kotwa Khas
 Kotwa Nilami
 Lakhranw
 Letia
 Mahuahi
 Mahuawan
 Maini Dih
 Majanuan
 Majhaulia
 Majhaulia
 Malpura
 Manpur
 Misrauli
 Mohanpur
 Mojharia
 Musahri
 Naharpur
 Neuri
 Ojaulia
 Pahladwa
 Pakariar
 Pakri
 Pakri Dih
 Panan  Khas
 Pararia
 Pariwadh
 Parsauni
 Parsidh Nath
 Patkhauli
 Patkhauli
 Patti Pachamwa
 Pokhar Bhinda
 Raipura
 Rajapur
 Ram Das Bagahi
 Rampur
 Rampur Kalan
 Rampur Khurd
 Raqba Rampur
 Rasauti
 Rudarpur
 Sahijan Kalan
 Sahijanwa Khurd
 Samogar
 Sarkarahi
 Sawanaha
 Shamdas Bagahi
 Shukrauli
 Sidhwania
 Sital Math
 Sohnaria
 Sukhsenwa Bhawani Ray
 Sukhsenwa Deu Ray
 Sukhsenwa Misir
 Sultanpur
 Tilauli
 Tilokwa

Kuchaikote 

 Adhmauli
 Adhmauli
 Ahirauli Dubauli
 Ahiyapur
 Amwa
 Amwa Bijaypur
 Arazi Jait Narahwa
 Arazi Math Hankar
 Arazipur
 Arzi Dharampur
 Asandi
 Baghauch
 Baidauli
 Baijalha
 Bakhri
 Baliwan Raemel
 Baliwan Sagar
 Bangal Khand
 Bangra
 Bania Chhapar
 Banian Chhapra
 Banjaria
 Banjaria
 Bankat
 Bankata
 Bantail
 Barhara
 Barnaia Bisa
 Barnaiya Gokhul
 Barnaiyan Rajaram
 Barwa Birt
 Barwa Khurd
 Basaunapur
 Basmanian
 Bathna
 Bedua
 Bel Banwa
 Belsara
 Belthari
 Belwa
 Belwa Birt
 Belwa Tiwari
 Belwari Patti
 Bharthia
 Bhatwa Parasram
 Bhatwa Rup
 Bhobhi Chak
 Bhoj Chhapar
 Bhopatpur
 Bhopatpur
 Bhuwal Khatwania
 Bijaypur
 Bikrampur
 Bindwalia
 Binod Kharea
 Bishambharpur
 Bishunpura
 Bishunpura
 Bodh Chhapar
 Burhi
 Chailwa
 Chak Hasna
 Chak Rampur
 Chandi Ojha
 Chanri Durg
 Chanri Partap
 Chauchakka
 Chauhan Patti
 Chauranw
 Chhatar Patti
 Dalea
 Daya Chhapra
 Derwa
 Dharampur
 Dharhwalia
 Dhebuwa
 Diara Bijaypur
 Diara Bijaypur Hissa
 Doman Banjaria
 Dubaulia
 Dube Kharea
 Dumaria
 Dumaria
 Durg Matihanian
 Garya Khal
 Ghatimpur
 Ghurna Patti
 Gopalpur
 Gopalpur
 Gopalpur
 Gulaura
 Harpur
 Hem Bardaha
 Hit Patti
 Hornada
 Isar Patti
 Iswapur
 Jabdauli
 Jagarnathpur
 Jait Narahwa
 Jalalpur
 Jamunia
 Jit Bardaha
 Jogipur
 Kaithaulia
 Karanpura
 Karmaini Ghazi
 Karmauni Mohabbat
 Karwatahi
 Kawalban Chak
 Kawla Chak
 Khairathwa
 Khairatia
 Khajuri
 Khal Ganw
 Khan Patti
 Khargauli
 Khem Matihanian
 Khutwanian Chaube
 Kilpur Khap
 Kuchai Kote
 Lachhi Kharea
 Lachhpur
 Lal Begi
 Lohar Patti
 Madha Chak
 Madho Math
 Mahuanwa
 Mairwa Karan
 Malahi
 Mangru Chhapar
 Maniara
 Mateya Khas
 Mateya Nathu
 Math Hankar
 Mathai Nandlal
 Mathia Hata
 Mathia Khas
 Mathia Panre
 Mathiya Dayaram
 Mathiya Hardo
 Matihani Binod
 Matihanian Kalan
 Matihanian Salehpur
 Matihanian Tewari
 Misrain Chak
 Mithua
 Narahwa Kot
 Narahwa Sukul
 Narayanpur
 Natwa
 Nichua Khas
 Nichua Khurd
 Nichua Panre Tola
 Nirjalaha
 Paharpur
 Paharpur Chhangur
 Paharpur Deyal
 Pakri
 Panchamwa
 Panre Kharea
 Parmanand Patti
 Parsauni Gopalpur
 Parsauni Panre
 Patti Chakkargopi
 Petbharia
 Pokhar Bhinda
 Pokhar Bhinda
 Pulwaria
 Purkhas
 Raghu Patti
 Rajapur
 Rajapur
 Rajaram Narahwa
 Ramgarhwa
 Rampur Babu
 Rampur Bhainsahi
 Rampur Daud
 Rampur Jaga
 Rampur Jiwdhar
 Rampur Kharea
 Rampur Khurd
 Rampur Madho
 Rampur Makund
 Raqba
 Ratanpura
 Rikhai Tola
 Rup Chhap
 Rup Chhapar
 Salehpur
 Sangwa Dih
 Sapahiya Khas
 Sapha
 Sasamusa
 Saunhi Birt
 Saunhi Erazi
 Saunhi Jagdish
 Semra
 Shahpur
 Shampur
 Sherpur
 Shiurajpur
 Sirsia
 Siswa
 Sital Bardaha
 Sital Narahwa
 Sobhan Chak
 Sonahula Chandra Bhan
 Sonahula Damodar
 Sonahula Gokhul
 Sonikpur
 Sujanpur
 Sukhdew Patti
 Suklauli
 Tiwari Kharea
 Tola Guman Ray
 Tola Palat Ray
 Tola Sipahiya
 Tola Sirsia
 Tula Chhapar
 Uchka Ganw
 Udkara

Manjha 

 Admapur
 Ahiraulia
 Alapur
 Amaithi Kalan
 Amaithi Khurd
 Arazi Dharam Parsa
 Arazi Ramnagar
 Bahora Tola
 Baikunthpur
 Bangra
 Bargachhia
 Bathua
 Bhagwanpur
 Bhainsahi
 Bhar Kuian
 Bhatwalia
 Bhojpurwa
 Bishambharpur
 Bishunpura
 Chanwar Amaithii
 Chhabahi Khas
 Chhabahi Shikmi
 Chhabahi Taqi
 Chhitauli
 Danapur
 Deuria
 Dewapur Mathia
 Dewapur Tola Akil
 Dewapur Tola Asaraut
 Dewapur Tola Mohar Singh
 Dhama Pakar
 Dhankhar
 Dharam Parsa
 Dhausi Tola
 Dhobaulia
 Diara Isapur
 Doma Hata
 Duldulia
 Dumriya
 Gausia
 Ghamandipur
 Gobindapur
 Goniar
 Gopalpur
 Harpur Gosain
 Hata
 Himtapur
 Imilia
 Indarwa
 Isapur Diara
 Jagarnatha
 Jalalpur
 Jhajhwa
 Kamanpura
 Kapilaspur
 Karanpura
 Keshapur
 Khap Mira Tola
 Khedu Chhapar
 Koini
 Korar
 Lahladpur
 Lerwariya Tola
 Lohjira
 Lohkhara
 Lohkhara Gosain
 Madhu Sarea
 Majhaulia
 Malikana
 Malikana
 Malikana Dhama
 Mangraha
 Manjha
 Math Deuria
 Mathia
 Mathia Umar
 Mir Alipur
 Mira Tola
 Misraulia
 Mujauna
 Munra
 Namuiyan
 Paithan Patti
 Partappur
 Pasrampur
 Pathan Patti
 Pathra
 Pathra
 Pathra Tola
 Phulwaria
 Pipra
 Pithauri
 Puraina
 Purdil Tola
 Sajapur
 Sanah
 Santpur
 Sareya
 Shahabuddin Tola
 Shahpur
 Shahzadpur
 Shekh Parsa
 Sipah Khas
 Sirampur Kolhua Pakar
 Tanrwa
 Telia Bandh
 Tola Alimullah
 Tola Duldulia
 Upar Chhanta
 Upar Chhanta
 Zafar Tola

Panchdewari 

 Ahirauli
 Arazi Pachdeuri
 Bagahwa
 Baherwa
 Baidauli
 Bankata
 Bankatia
 Bara Chanp
 Barai Beli
 Batar Choraha
 Beli Dasaundhi
 Bhagwanpur
 Bhangaha
 Bhangahi
 Bhatpoia
 Bhatwa
 Bhatwa Khurd
 Bhirgi Chak
 Bishunpura
 Chain Tola
 Chakarpan
 Chakia
 Chaphi
 Chhitauna
 Datt Patti
 Deuria
 Dhadhuwa
 Diulia
 Dubaulia
 Durga Chak
 Gahni
 Ganga Ram Tola
 Gopalpur
 Gorianw
 Gurianw
 Hararwa Kalan
 Indar Patti
 Jamunha
 Jasauli
 Kapuri
 Khalganw
 Khappoia
 Kubrahi
 Kukur Bhunka
 Kusa Khurd
 Lami Chaur
 Lohti
 Machwa
 Magahia
 Mahathwa
 Mahuawa
 Manik Chhapra
 Manjharia
 Mathia
 Maunaha
 Misrauli
 Mojhwalia
 Motipur
 Munjaha
 Nagadpoia
 Nandpatti
 Natwa
 Nehruwa Kalan
 Niharuwa Khurd
 Nimuia
 Nirpat Chhapr
 Nohar Tola
 Pach Deuri
 Parsa
 Parsauni Kalan
 Parsauni Khurd
 Patohwa
 Phattu Chhapur
 Piprahi
 Poia Girdhar
 Poia Rup
 Rajapur
 Rajapur
 Rampur
 Rampur
 Rupi Bagahi
 Sabya
 Semaria
 Shekh Beli
 Sidharia
 Sikatia
 Sikatia Sujan
 Sital Choraha
 Sohagpur
 Sukrauli
 Sureman Chak
 Ter Khemraj
 Tetarira Jagarnath
 Tetariya Bhichha Ram
 Tetariya Bikhal
 Tetariya Bodhraut
 Tetariya Dhup Sah
 Tiwari Chhapra
 Tiwari Tola

Phulwariya 

 Bairagi Tola
 Balbhadar Parsa
 Balepur
 Baniya Chhapar
 Bansi Batraha
 Bathua Bazar
 Bhagwanpur
 Bhagwat Parsa Kalan
 Bhawani Chhapar
 Birnaha
 Birsa Bathua
 Bishunpura
 Chak Bijuli
 Chak Chand
 Chak Jitan
 Chamari Patti
 Chaube Parsa
 Chhattu Bathua
 Churaman Chak
 Dewan Parsa
 Dhana Chak
 Dhani Chak
 Dubaulia
 Dubey Batraha
 Dularpur
 Dularpur Khurd
 Ganesh Dumar
 Ghasi Chak
 Gidha
 Girdhar Parsa
 Gular Baga urf Kushum Bathua
 Harihara
 Hathauji
 Indar Bhan Chak
 Jagdishpur
 Jataha
 Kamal Kant Karariya urf Bahri
 Kanthi Bathua
 Kapur Chak
 Kararia Bhitari
 Kelauni
 Kishundeu Chhapar
 Koila Dewa
 Kothea
 Kotwa Khem
 Kunar Bathua
 Lachchhan Tola
 Lakri Banbir
 Lakri Bishunpur
 Lakri Chaube
 Larhpur
 Lila Parsa
 Madho Math
 Madhopur
 Madhopur
 Magirwa Khurd
 Majirwa Kalan
 Mangha
 Manjha Chaturbhuj
 Manjha Goshain
 Manjha Imilia
 Manjha Kanhwaria
 Maripur
 Math Bairisal
 Meghwa
 Misir Batraha
 Moti Chak
 Murar Bataraha
 Paikauli Bado
 Paikauli Naraen
 Pakri Sham
 Panchamwa
 Panre Parsa
 Pawar Bataraha
 Penula Misir
 Penula Ramsen
 Phulwaria
 Purandar Bathua
 Qazipur
 Raghunandanpur urf chamanpatti
 Rajpur
 Rampur
 Rampur
 Raqba
 Rupi Bataraha
 Saddu Dih
 Sagrampur
 Sagrampur Gopal
 Saheb Chappra
 Saheb Chhapra
 Salar Kalan
 Salar Khurd
 Satain Ki Khap
 Saunha
 Saunhi Patti
 Semarawna
 Shaho Chak
 Shahpur Batraha
 Siaraha
 Sirsia
 Takia
 Tanrwa Khemraj
 Tanwa Khas
 Thakuri Chak
 Tika Chhapar
 Turkaha

Sidhwaliya 

 Amarpura
 Bahadura
 Bakhraur
 Bakhraur Tola Birt
 Banjaria
 Barahima
 Bhojpurwa
 Bishunpura
 Bucheya
 Budhsi
 Dumaria
 Gaji Gaura
 Gauri
 Gopalpur
 Harpur
 Harpur Tengrahi
 Jagiraha
 Jagiraha
 Jalalpur Kalan
 Jalalpur Khurd
 Jhajhwa
 Joigar
 Kabirpur
 Karasghat
 Kashi Tengrahi
 Katea Khas
 Katea Tola Mohkam Ray
 Kesho Gaura
 Kusahar
 Lohjra
 Madhopur
 Madhopur Turkaha
 Mahammadpur
 Mangolpur
 Matauli
 Mathia
 Pakri
 Pipra
 Rampurwa
 Sakla
 Sakla
 Salehpur
 Shahpur
 Sher
 Sidhwalia
 Supauli
 Surhia
 Tandaspur
 Teknewas
 Tola Sakla

Thawe 

 Bagaha Nizamat
 Bagaha Saida
 Barari Jagdish
 Bargachhia
 Bedu Tola
 Bhawanipur
 Bheria
 Bhusanw
 Bidesi Tola
 Birdaban
 Birt Uchhahal Tola
 Bisambharpur
 Chanawe
 Chitu Tola
 Dhatiwna
 Doaba Amaithi
 Ekderwa
 Gajadhar Tola
 Gawandari Fakirana
 Gawndri
 Gond
 Gopla Math
 Harbansa
 Hardia
 Harpur
 Indarwa Badullah
 Indarwa Bairam
 Indarwa Rafi
 Indarwa Shakir
 Jagdishpur
 Jagmalwa
 Khanpur Azmat
 Khanpur Kalan
 Lachhwar
 Math Gautam
 Narayanpur
 Pakho Pali
 Pearepur
 Phataha
 Phunguni
 Ramchandarpur
 Rikhai Tola
 Semra
 Shiwasthan
 Sihorwa
 Sughar Tola
 Sughar Tola Birt
 Sukulwa Kalan
 Sukulwa Khurd
 Sundarpatti
 Thawe
 Uchhahal Tola
 Zamin Bheria

Uchkagaon 

 Amtha Bhuwan
 Arna
 Asandapur
 Bairia Durg
 Bairia Thakurai
 Bairya Dhorhan
 Balbhaddar Patti
 Banki Khal
 Barari Harkesh
 Barhmani
 Belsara
 Belwa
 Bhuala
 Birwat Bazar
 Birwat Ghuran
 Birwat Kamaluddin
 Chak Joga
 Dahi Bhatta
 Darwani Chak
 Dhangarhi
 Dharam Chak
 Domaria
 Domdih
 Donrapur
 Ekdarwa
 Ghora Ghat
 Gurmha
 Harayia
 Harpur
 Itwa
 Jamsar
 Jamsar Khap
 Jamsari
 Jhirwa
 kawahin
 Kaparahar
 Kaparpura
 Kathwalia
 Kharharwa
 Kotwa
 Lakhna Khas
 Lakhna Zamin
 Luhsi
 Madhu Bairia
 Mahuawa
 Manbodh Parsauni
 Maqsudpur
 Mathauli Khas
 Mathauli Panre
 Mohaicha
 Munra
 Munri Barari
 Narayanpur
 Narkatia
 Natan Kalan
 Natwan Khurd
 Nawada Parsauni
 Ojhwalia
 Pakri Sirikant
 Panrepur urf Churaman Chhapra
 Parsauni Khas
 Parwalia
 Penula Khas
 Piprahi
 Pirara
 Pokhar Bhinda
 Qazipur
 Raghua
 Rajapur
 Rasauti
 SalemPatti
 Sanah Madho
 Sankhe Chhotka
 Sankhe Khas
 Sat Kothwa
 Sathi
 Shampur
 Shampur
 Siswaniya
 Suraunian
 Tilokpur
 Tulsia
 Uchka Ganw

Vijayipur 

 Rande
 Mathia
 Bande
 Barahra
 Mathauli
 Bhawani Chhapra
 Bhajauli Khurd
 Mitupur
 Pagra
 Sihpur
 Bhajauli Kalan
 Marpi
 Jagdishpur
 Chugri
 Tetaria
 Karam Char
 Itwa
 Sabea
 Sukhpura
 Khairatia
 Rampur
 Khiria
 Sonbarsa
 Chainpur
 Amawa
 Hari Marpi
 Harpur
 Maheshpur
 Khajuha Khurd
 Puraina
 Pagra Khurd
 Bamhnauli
 Mathia
 Panrepur
 Belwa
 Bijuli Chak
 Mathiya lala
 Chhathianw
 Kurthia
 Khajuha Kalan
 Pipra
 Banjaria
 Jajwalia
 Belwa
 Baurahi
 Mahuawa
 Chhaprahi
 Chak Dhanauti
 Dighwa
 Tilauli
 Surajpura
 Bilarua
 Nautan
 Dhanauti
 Rampurwa
 Rautari
 Pharusha
 Aghaila Misir
 Aghaila Babu
 Korea
 Lohrauli
 Parsauni
 Kaliyanwa
 Bhanpur
 Lachhmipur
 Saropai
 Parsahi
 Bankata
 Samhuti
 Nonapakar
 KhiriDih
 Bharpurwa
 Mathia Dih
 Ghuran Chhapra
 Amwa Ghat
 Nauka Tola
 Bamhnauli
 Khutaha
 Chaumukha
 Manki Dih
 Kawla Chak
 Rasulpur
 Manrar Khas
 Bhathwa
 Bijaipur
 Basaha
 Darzi Chak
 Hariharpur
 Sumerpur
 Bishunpura
 Rewahi
 Bandhaura Ghat
 Kaithwalia
 Misir Bandhowra
 Kandla
 Mahui
 Ramnagar
 Harpur
 Bankata
 Ganga Chhapar
 Musahri
 Hankarpur
 Suaraha
 Belwa
 Sukhlal Chhapar
 Ratanpura
 Ainthi
 Kotia
 Barachap
 Birwat
 Bishunpura
 Kohrauliya
 Patkhauli
 Dhobwal
 Sudama Chak
 Bikrampur
 Matiari
 Mathia
 Chharidaha
 Baherwa
 Shiudat Chhapra
 Bakainiyan
 Majhaulia
 Udaypura
 Naua Dih
 Piprarhi
 Kishunpura
 Sondiha
 Parsa
 Babhnauli
 Ranipur
 Math Mahuawa
 Mahuawa Khas
 Chikwaliya
 Merhwa
 Chhitauna
 Karmanpur
 Chakhni
 Ahiapur
 Bhoriya
 Mathiya
 Bangra
 Majhariya

References

Gopalganj district

Gopalganj district, India